The Admiralen class were eight destroyers built for the Royal Netherlands Navy between 1926 and 1931. All ships fought in World War II and were scuttled or sunk.

Design
These ships were built in the Netherlands with assistance from the British company Yarrow (at that time the leading builder of destroyers in the world). The Dutch ships were based on the British destroyer .  A novel feature was the provision of a seaplane for scouting. There was however no catapult, the plane being lowered into the sea by a crane.

The differences between the two groups were minor; the second group was fitted for minesweeping rather than mine laying, and they carried one less  gun for 30 tons of fuel.

Design
Between 1925 and 1928 eight new destroyers were laid down to replace the Wolf-class destroyers. The design came from Yarrow & Co, they based it on HMS Ambuscade and HMS Amazon. The Royal Netherlands Navy took the Yarrow & Co design and made some minor changes.

The first group was fitted with four 120mm no. 4 Bofors guns, while the second group was fitted with four 120mm no. 5 HIH Siderius guns. The main differences are the mounts used and the no. 4 were able to elevate between −5 and +30 degrees while the no. 5 guns could elevate between −5 and +35 degrees, giving a range of 19,500 meters.

The second group was equipped with 40mm no. 1 Vickers AA guns, however these guns had problems firing at higher angles; the guns would malfunction or not fire at all. Because of this the ships of this group could use only their single 75mm AA gun against targets above 1000 meters. After 12 years of ignoring this issue it was finally solved in 1939 by stiffening the guns, however when Germany invaded the Netherlands in May 1940 this issue wasn't solved for the surface ships of the Royal Netherlands Navy.

Ships

References

Citations

References

External links
  Dutch destroyers at Unithistories.com

 

Destroyer classes
 
World War II destroyers of the Netherlands